Siarhei Uladzimiravich Cherachen (also known as Sergey Vladimirovich Cherechen ; born 8 May 1985) is a Belarusian businessman, politician and candidate in the 2020 Belarusian presidential election. He is the current chairman of the Belarusian Social Democratic Assembly.

Biography 
Cherachen was born on 8 May 1985 in the late Soviet era in Krychaw, Mogilev. He grew up and raised up in Mogilev where he also completed his primary and secondary education.

Career 
He graduated from the Belarusian State University in the field of informatics and radio electronics. After his graduation, he pursued his career in business and later joined the mainstream politics. He joined the Communist Party of Belarus and was also nominated as a candidate for the House of Representatives of Belarus but was not elected.

2020 presidential election 
On 12 January 2020, he was nominated as a presidential candidate from the party for the 2020 Belarusian presidential election.

On 10 August 2020, the election results were released and Cherachen received the fewest votes among the five candidates, with a total valid vote count of 1.15%.

References 

1985 births
Belarusian businesspeople
Belarusian politicians
Belarusian Social Democratic Assembly politicians
Living people
People from Krychaw
Belarusian State University alumni
Candidates for President of Belarus